Gerber is a former railway station in Gerber, California. Long a depot of the Southern Pacific, it was an inaugural Amtrak Coast Starlight stop when the route started in 1971 (prior to the route receiving its named designation). Service did not last, however, with trains bypassing the station starting on June 11, 1972.

References

Railway stations closed in 1972
Former Southern Pacific Railroad stations in California
Former Amtrak stations in California
1972 disestablishments in California
Transportation buildings and structures in Tehama County, California